Dillon Lawson is an American professional baseball hitting coach for the New York Yankees of Major League Baseball, beginning in 2022.

Lawson attended Transylvania University, where he played college baseball as a catcher and first baseman. After graduating, he became a coach at Lindenwood University from 2007 to 2009, IMG Academy from 2010 through 2011, and Morehead State University from 2009 through 2012, and Southeast Missouri State University from 2012 through 2015. In 2016, Lawson was the hitting coach for the Tri-City ValleyCats, and in 2017 he coached for the University of Missouri. In 2018, he coached for the Quad Cities River Bandits.

The New York Yankees hired Lawson as their minor league hitting coordinator in 2018. After the 2021 season, the Yankees promoted him to be their major league hitting coach.

References

Living people
Year of birth missing (living people)
Major League Baseball hitting coaches
New York Yankees coaches
Transylvania Pioneers baseball players
Lindenwood Lions coaches
Morehead State Eagles baseball coaches
Southeast Missouri State Redhawks baseball coaches
Missouri Tigers baseball coaches
High school baseball coaches in the United States